National Highway 352R, commonly referred to as NH 352R is a national highway in India. It is a spur road of National Highway 52.  NH-352R traverses the state of Haryana in India.

Route 
NH 352R connects Jhajjar, Dulhera, Daboda Khurd, Nuna Majra and Bahadurgarh.

Junctions  
 
  near Jhajjar, India
  near Bahadurgarh, India

See also 
 List of National Highways in India
 List of National Highways in India by state

References

External links 

 NH 352R on OpenStreetMap

National highways in India
National Highways in Haryana